Banuta is a small settlement north of Lendava in the Prekmurje region of Slovenia.

References

External links
Banuta on Geopedia

Populated places in the Municipality of Lendava